Scognamillo is an Italian surname. Notable people with the surname include:

Gabriel Scognamillo (1906–1974), Italian art director
Giovanni Scognamillo (1929–2016), Turkish film critic
Stefano Scognamillo (born 1994), Italian footballer of Russian origin

Italian-language surnames